Say-10 is an independent record label and skateboard company owned by Adam Gecking and operated from his house in Richmond, Virginia. Say-10 was founded in 2007 in Virginia Beach, Virginia, while he owned Volume, an independent record store.

Artists with releases on Say-10
Alkaline Trio
Among Giants
Aspiga
Banner Pilot
Beach Slang
Broadway Calls
Brook Pridemore
Brutal Youth
Challenges
Civil War Rust
Cobra Skulls
Counterpunch
Daycare Swindlers
Direct Hit!
Dirty Tactics
Divided Heaven
Dog Park Dissidents
Entropy
GDP
Great Apes
Gutter Gloss
Fucked Up
Iron Chic
Jared Hart
Karbomb
Know Your Saints
Lagwagon
The Lawrence Arms
Less Than Jake
Let It Go
The Lillingtons
Mad Conductor
 Matt Pless
Murder by Death
Oh My Snare!
Oklahoma Car Crash
Payoff
Pedals On Our Pirate Ships
Pissing Contest
The Priceduifkes
Red City Radio
Retox
The Riot Before
The Scandals
Seagulls
Shayfer James
The Shell Corporation
Slutever
Smoke or Fire
Stabbed in Back
Static Scene
Supreme Commander
Teenage Bottlerocket
Teen Agers
Three One G
Überyou
Utter Failure
The Vandals
Walk the Plank
Who's Driving? Bear's Driving!
Will Wood

References

American independent record labels
Punk record labels
Companies based in Richmond, Virginia